Raymond "Ray" Pennick (born 30 November 1946) is an English former footballer who played as a forward. He played for Willington and York City.

Career
Born in Ferryhill, County Durham, Pennick was a student teacher when playing for Willington in the Northern League. He impressed in a friendly against Fourth Division York City in March 1963 and was signed by the club on amateur terms later that month. His debut came as a 60th minute substitute for Archie Taylor in a 0–0 draw at home to Halifax Town on 5 May 1969. This was Pennick's only appearance for York and he left the club in June 1969.

Career statistics

Footnotes

References

1946 births
Living people
People from Ferryhill
Footballers from County Durham
English footballers
Association football forwards
Willington A.F.C. players
York City F.C. players
English Football League players